Admiral Scheer  was a  heavy cruiser (often termed a pocket battleship) which served with the  (War Navy) of Nazi Germany during World War II. The vessel was named after Admiral Reinhard Scheer, German commander in the Battle of Jutland. She was laid down at the Reichsmarinewerft shipyard in Wilhelmshaven in June 1931 and completed by November 1934. Originally classified as an armored ship (Panzerschiff) by the Reichsmarine, in February 1940 the Germans reclassified the remaining two ships of this class as heavy cruisers.

Armed with six  guns in two triple gun turrets, Admiral Scheer and her sisters were designed to outgun any cruiser fast enough to catch them. Their top speed of  left only a handful of ships in the Anglo-French navies able to catch them and powerful enough to sink them.

Admiral Scheer saw heavy service with the German Navy, including a deployment to Spain during the Spanish Civil War, where she bombarded the port of Almería. Her first operation during World War II was a commerce raiding operation into the southern Atlantic Ocean; she also made a brief foray into the Indian Ocean. During the operation, she sank  of shipping, making her the most successful capital ship surface raider of the war. Following her return to Germany, she was deployed to northern Norway to interdict shipping to the Soviet Union. She was part of the abortive attack on Convoy PQ 17 and conducted Operation Wunderland, a sortie into the Kara Sea. After returning to Germany at the end of 1942, the ship served as a training ship until the end of 1944, when she was used to support ground operations against the Soviet Army. She moved to Kiel for repairs in March 1945, where she was capsized by British bombers in a raid on 9 April 1945 and partially scrapped; the remainder of the wreck was buried when the inner part of Kiel dockyard was filled in after the war.

Design

Admiral Scheer was powered by four sets of MAN nine-cylinder double-acting two-stroke diesel engines. As designed, her standard complement consisted of 33 officers and 586 enlisted men, though after 1935 this was significantly increased to 30 officers and 921–1,040 sailors.

Admiral Scheers primary armament was six  SK C/28 guns mounted in two triple gun turrets, one forward and one aft of the superstructure. The ship carried a secondary battery of eight  SK C/28 guns in single turrets grouped amidships. Her anti-aircraft battery originally consisted of three  L/45 guns, though in 1935 these were replaced with six 8.8 cm L/78 guns. By 1940 the ship's anti-aircraft battery was significantly increased, consisting of six  C/33 guns, four twin-mounted  C/30 guns and up to twenty-eight  Flak 30 guns. By 1945, the anti-aircraft battery had again been reorganized and comprised six 4 cm guns, eight 3.7 cm guns, and thirty-three 2 cm guns.

The ship also carried a pair of quadruple  deck-mounted torpedo tubes placed on her stern. The ship was equipped with two Arado Ar 196 seaplanes and one catapult. Radar initially consisted of a FMG 39 G(gO) set, though in 1941 this was replaced with an FMG 40 G(gO) set and a FuMO 26 system.

Service history

Admiral Scheer was ordered by the Reichsmarine from the Reichsmarinewerft shipyard in Wilhelmshaven. Naval rearmament was not popular with the Social Democrats and the Communists in the German Reichstag, so it was not until 1931 that a bill was passed to build a second Panzerschiff. The money for Panzerschiff B, which was ordered as Ersatz , was secured after the Social Democrats abstained to prevent a political crisis. Her keel was laid on 25 June 1931, under construction number 123. The ship was launched on 1 April 1933; at her launching, she was christened by Marianne Besserer, the daughter of Admiral Reinhard Scheer, the ship's namesake. She was completed slightly over a year and a half later on 12 November 1934, the day she was commissioned into the German fleet. The old pre-dreadnought battleship  was removed from service and her crew transferred to the newly commissioned panzerschiff.

At her commissioning in November 1934, Admiral Scheer was placed under the command of Kapitän zur See (KzS) Wilhelm Marschall. The ship spent the remainder of 1934 conducting sea trials and training her crew. In 1935, she had a new catapult and landing sail system to operate her Arado seaplanes on heavy seas installed. 
From 1 October 1935 to 26 July 1937 her first officer was Leopold Bürkner, later to become head of foreign intelligence in the Third Reich.
By October 1935, the ship was ready for her first major cruise, when on 25–28 October she visited Madeira, returning to Kiel on 8 November. The following summer, she cruised out through the Skagerrak and the English Channel into the Irish Sea, before visiting Stockholm on the return voyage.

Spanish Civil War
Admiral Scheers first overseas deployment began in July 1936 when she was sent to Spain to evacuate German civilians caught in the midst of the Spanish Civil War. From 8 August 1936 she served together with her sister ship  on non-intervention patrols off the Republican-held coast of Spain. She served four tours of duty with the non-intervention patrol through June 1937. Her official objective was to control the influx of war materiel into Spain, though she also recorded Soviet ships carrying supplies to the Republicans and protected ships delivering German weapons to Nationalist forces. During the deployment to Spain, Ernst Lindemann served as the ship's first gunnery officer. After Deutschland was attacked on 29 May 1937 by Spanish Republican Air Force aircraft off Ibiza, Admiral Scheer was ordered to bombard the Republican-held port of Almería in reprisal. On 31 May 1937, the anniversary of the Battle of Jutland, Admiral Scheer, flying the Imperial War Flag, arrived off Almería at 07:29 and opened fire on shore batteries, naval installations and ships in the harbor. On 26 June 1937, she was relieved by her sister ship , allowing her to return to Wilhelmshaven on 1 July. She returned to the Mediterranean between August and October, however. In September 1936 KzS Otto Ciliax had replaced Marschall as the ship's commanding officer.

World War II
At the outbreak of World War II in September 1939, Admiral Scheer remained at anchor in the Schillig roadstead outside Wilhelmshaven, with the heavy cruiser . On 4 September, two groups of five Bristol Blenheim bombers attacked the ships. The first group surprised the anti-aircraft gunners aboard Admiral Scheer, who nevertheless managed to shoot down one of the five Blenheims. One bomb struck the ship's deck and failed to explode, and two detonated in the water near the ship. The remaining bombs also failed to explode. The second group of five Blenheims were confronted by the alerted German defenses, which shot down four of the five bombers. Admiral Scheer emerged from the attack undamaged. In November 1939, KzS Theodor Krancke became the ship's commanding officer.

Admiral Scheer underwent a refit while her sister ships set out on commerce raiding operations in the Atlantic. Admiral Scheer was modified during the early months of 1940, including the installation of a new, raked clipper bow. The heavy command tower was replaced with a lighter structure, and she was reclassified as a heavy cruiser. Additional anti-aircraft guns were also installed, along with updated radar equipment. On 19–20 July RAF bombers attacked Admiral Scheer and the battleship , though they failed to score any hits. On 27 July, the ship was pronounced ready for service.

Atlantic sortie

Admiral Scheer sailed in October 1940 on her first combat sortie. On the night of 31 October she slipped through the Denmark Strait and broke into the open Atlantic. Her B-Dienst radio intercept equipment identified the convoy HX 84, sailing from Halifax, Nova Scotia. Admiral Scheers Arado seaplane located the convoy on 5 November 1940. The armed merchant cruiser , the sole escort for the convoy, issued a report of the German raider and attempted to prevent her from attacking the convoy, which was ordered to scatter under cover of a smoke screen. Admiral Scheers first salvo scored hits on Jervis Bay, disabling her wireless equipment and steering gear. Shells from her second salvo struck the bridge and killed her commander, Edward Fegen. Admiral Scheer sank Jervis Bay within 22 minutes, but the engagement delayed the German ship long enough for most of the convoy to escape. Admiral Scheer sank only five of the convoy's 37 ships, though a sixth was sunk by the Luftwaffe following the convoy's dispersal.

On 18 December, Admiral Scheer encountered the refrigerator ship Duquesa, of some  displacement. The ship sent off a distress signal, which the German raider deliberately allowed, to draw British naval forces to the area. Krancke wanted to lure British warships to the area to draw attention away from Admiral Hipper, which had just exited the Denmark Strait.

Between 26 December and 7 January, Admiral Scheer rendezvoused with the supply ships Nordmark and Eurofeld, the auxiliary cruiser , and the prizes Duquesa and Storstad. The raiders transferred some 600 prisoners to Storstad while they refueled from Nordmark and Eurofeld. Between 18 and 20 January Admiral Scheer captured three Allied merchant ships totalling , including the Norwegian oil tanker Sandefjord. She spent Christmas 1940 at sea in the mid-Atlantic, several hundred miles from Tristan da Cunha, before making a foray into the Indian Ocean in February 1941.

The raiders resupplied from Tannenfels and exchanged information on Allied merchant traffic in the area, parting company on 17 February. Admiral Scheer then steamed to the Seychelles north of Madagascar, where she found two merchant vessels with her Arado floatplanes. She took the  oil tanker British Advocate as a prize and sank the  Greek-flagged Grigorios. A third ship, the  Canadian Cruiser, managed to send a distress signal before Admiral Scheer sank her on 21 February. The raider encountered and sank a fourth ship the following day, the  Dutch steamer Rantaupandjang, though she too was able to send a distress signal before she sank.

The British cruiser , which was patrolling in the area, received both messages from Admiral Scheers victims. Glasgow launched reconnaissance aircraft that spotted Admiral Scheer on 22 February. Krancke turned to the south-east to evade his pursuers, reaching the South Atlantic by 3 March. The British, meanwhile, had abandoned the hunt on 25 February when it became clear that Admiral Scheer had withdrawn from the area.

She reached Bergen, Norway on 30 March, where she spent a day in the Grimstadfjord. A destroyer escort joined the ship for the voyage to Kiel, which they reached on 1 April. She was by far the most successful German capital ship commerce raider of the entire war. After returning to Germany, Krancke left the ship and was replaced by KzS Wilhelm Meendsen-Bohlken in June 1941. The loss of the battleship  in May 1941, and more importantly, the Royal Navy's destruction of the German supply ship network in the aftermath of the Bismarck operation forced a planned Atlantic raiding operation for Admiral Scheer and her sister Lützow at the end of 1941 to be abandoned. On 4–8 September, Admiral Scheer was briefly moved to Oslo. There, on 5 and 8 September, No. 90 Squadron RAF, equipped with Boeing B-17 Flying Fortress bombers, mounted a pair of unsuccessful attacks on the ship. On 8 September, the ship left Oslo and returned to Swinemünde.

Deployment to Norway

After stopping briefly in Grimstadfjord, the ships proceeded on to Trondheim. On 23 February, the British submarine  torpedoed Prinz Eugen, causing serious damage. The first operation in Norway in which Admiral Scheer took part was Operation Rösselsprung, in July 1942. On 2 July, the ship sortied as part of the attempt to intercept Arctic convoy PQ-17. Admiral Scheer and Lützow formed one group while Tirpitz and Admiral Hipper composed another. While en route to the rendezvous point, Lützow and three destroyers ran aground, forcing the entire group to abandon the operation. Admiral Scheer was detached to join Tirpitz and Admiral Hipper in Altafjord. The British detected the German departure and ordered the convoy to scatter. Aware that surprise had been lost, the Germans broke off the surface attack and turned the destruction of PQ-17 over to the U-boats and Luftwaffe. Twenty-four of the convoy's thirty-five transports were sunk.

In August 1942, she conducted Operation Wunderland, a sortie into the Kara Sea to interdict Soviet shipping and attack targets of opportunity. The length of the mission and the distances involved precluded a destroyer escort for the operation; three destroyers would escort Admiral Scheer until they reached Novaya Zemlya, at which point they would return to Norway. Two U-boats —  and  — patrolled the Kara Gate and the Yugorsky Strait. The Germans originally intended to send Admiral Scheer with her sister ship Lützow, but since the latter had run aground the previous month, she was unavailable for the operation.

The operational plan called for strict radio silence to ensure surprise could be maintained. This required Meendsen-Bohlken to have total tactical and operational control of his ship; shore-based commands would be unable to direct the mission. On 16 August, Admiral Scheer and her destroyer escort left Narvik on a course to pass to the north of Novaya Zemlya. Upon entering the Kara Sea, she encountered heavy ice; in addition to searching for merchant shipping, the Arado floatplane was used to scout paths through the ice fields. On 25 August, she encountered the Soviet icebreaker Sibiryakov. Admiral Scheer sank the icebreaker, but not before she sent a distress signal. The German ship then turned south, and two days later, arrived off the port of Dikson. Admiral Scheer damaged two ships in the port and shelled harbor facilities. Meendsen-Bohlken considered sending a landing party ashore, but firing from Soviet shore batteries convinced him to abandon the plan. After breaking off the bombardment, Meendsen-Bohlken decided to return to Narvik. She reached port on 30 August without having achieved any significant successes.

On 23 October Admiral Scheer, Tirpitz and the destroyers Z4 Richard Beitzen, and  left Bogen Bay and proceeded to Trondheim. There, Tirpitz stopped for repairs, while Admiral Scheer and Z28 continued on to Germany. Fregattenkapitän Ernst Gruber served as the ship's acting commander at the end of November. In December 1942, Admiral Scheer returned to Wilhelmshaven for major overhaul, where she was attacked and slightly damaged by RAF bombers. Consequently, Admiral Scheer moved to the less exposed port of Swinemünde. In February 1943, KzS Richard Rothe-Roth took command of the ship. Until the end of 1944 Admiral Scheer was part of the Fleet Training Group.

Return to the Baltic
KzS Ernst-Ludwig Thienemann, the ship's final commander, took command of Admiral Scheer in April 1944. The Soviet Air Force launched several air attacks on the German forces, all of which were successfully repelled by heavy anti-aircraft fire. The ship's Arado floatplane was shot down, however. On the night of 23–24 November, the German naval forces completed the evacuation of the island. In all, 4,694 troops were evacuated from the island.

In early February 1945, Admiral Scheer stood off Samland with several torpedo boats in support of German forces fighting Soviet advances. On 9 February, the ships began shelling Soviet positions. Between 18 and 24 February, German forces launched a local counterattack; Admiral Scheer and the torpedo boats provided artillery support, targeting Soviet positions near Peyse and Gross-Heydekrug. The German attack temporarily restored the land connection to Königsberg. The ship's guns were badly worn out by March and in need of repair. On 8 March, Admiral Scheer departed the eastern Baltic to have her guns relined in Kiel; she carried 800 civilian refugees and 200 wounded soldiers. An uncleared minefield prevented her from reaching Kiel, and so she unloaded her passengers in Swinemünde. Despite her worn-out gun barrels, the ship then shelled Soviet forces outside Kolberg until she used up her remaining ammunition.

The ship then loaded refugees and left Swinemünde; she successfully navigated the minefields on the way to Kiel, arriving on 18 March. Her stern turret had its guns replaced at the Deutsche Werke shipyard by early April. During the repair process, most of the ship's crew went ashore. On the night of 9 April 1945, a general RAF bombing raid by over 300 aircraft struck the harbor in Kiel. Admiral Scheer was hit by bombs and capsized. She was partially broken up for scrap after the end of the war, though part of the hull was left in place and buried with rubble from the attack when the inner harbours were filled in post-war. The number of casualties from her loss is unknown.

See also
Leon-Henri Roth

Footnotes

Notes

Citations

References

External links

 The battle of Convoy HX84

1933 ships
Deutschland-class cruisers
Maritime incidents in April 1945
Military units and formations of Nazi Germany in the Spanish Civil War
Ships built in Wilhelmshaven
Cruisers sunk by aircraft
World War II cruisers of Germany
World War II shipwrecks in the Baltic Sea
Ships sunk by British aircraft